James Johnson Lindley (January 1, 1822 – April 18, 1891) was a U.S. Representative from Missouri.

Born in Mansfield, Ohio, Lindley moved with his parents to Cynthiana, Kentucky, in 1836.
He attended Woodville College, Ohio.
He moved to St. Louis, Missouri, in 1843.
He studied law.
He was admitted to the bar in 1846 and commenced practice in Monticello, Missouri.

Lindley was elected circuit attorney in 1848 and 1852.

Lindley was elected as a Whig to the Thirty-third Congress and reelected as an Opposition Party candidate to the Thirty-fourth Congress (March 4, 1853 – March 3, 1857).
He was not a candidate for reelection in 1856.
He moved to Davenport, Iowa, in 1858 and continued the practice of law.
Commissioned to investigate the condition of Iowa troops serving in the Civil War.
After the war practiced his profession in Chicago until 1868, when he moved to St. Louis, Missouri.
He served as judge of the circuit court of the eighth judicial district of Missouri in 1871–1883.
He moved to Kansas City, Missouri.
He retired from business activities.
He died at the home of a son in Nevada, Missouri, April 18, 1891.
He was interred in Elmwood Cemetery, Kansas City, Missouri.

References

1822 births
1891 deaths
Politicians from Mansfield, Ohio
Missouri Oppositionists
Whig Party members of the United States House of Representatives from Missouri
Opposition Party members of the United States House of Representatives from Missouri
19th-century American politicians
People from Monticello, Missouri